The  is a commuter electric multiple unit (EMU) train type operated by Nagoya Railroad (Meitetsu) in Japan since 2008.

Formation
Trains are formed as follows.

The M1 and M2 cars each have one single-arm pantograph.

Interior

History
The first 4-car set was built in 2008 for use on the Meitetsu Seto Line, entering service on 1 October 2008. Two more sets were delivered in April and May 2009, followed by two more sets in October and November 2009.

Two sets were delivered during fiscal 2011, bringing the total fleet to 32 vehicles (8 sets) by March 2012. Five sets were delivered during spring and summer of 2012, and three sets each in early 2013 and 2014. The 4000 series now consists of 18 four-car sets, thus completely replacing the older types 6000, 6600 and 6750. Since April 2014, the 4000 series has been the only train type on the Seto Line.

References

External links

 Meitetsu 4000 series (Nippon Sharyo) 
 Meitetsu 4000 series (Japan Railfan Magazine) 

Electric multiple units of Japan
4000 series
Train-related introductions in 2008
Nippon Sharyo multiple units
1500 V DC multiple units of Japan